American Cuisine (Cuisine américaine) is a 1998 French film directed by Jean-Yves Pitoun and starring Jason Lee, Eddy Mitchell, Irène Jacob, and Isabelle Petit-Jacques. It was released in the United States in 2001.

Premise
After a conflict with an officer, Loren Collins got fired from the US Navy, where he was learning to be a chef. Too poor to pay for cooking studies, he went to Dijon and got hired by Louis Boyer, the bad tempered owner of a prestigious restaurant.

Cast
 Jason Lee : Loren Collins
 Eddy Mitchell : Louis Boyer
 Irène Jacob : Gabrielle Boyer
 Isabelle Petit-Jacques : Carole
 Sylvie Loeillet : Suzanne
 Thibault de Montalembert : Vincent
 Anthony Valentine : Wellington
 Isabelle Leprince : Agnès
 Laurent Gendron : Bruno
 Gérard Chaillou : Roger
 Lyes Salem : Karim
 Linda Powell : Miller
 Skipp Sudduth : Wicks
 David Gabison : Fredet
 Keith Hill : Germaine

References

External links
 
 

1998 films
1990s English-language films
English-language French films
1990s French-language films
1998 multilingual films
French multilingual films
1990s French films